A diver down flag, or scuba flag, is a flag used on the water to indicate that there is a diver below. Two styles of flag are in use.  Internationally, the code flag alfa/alpha, which is white and blue, is used to signal that the vessel has a diver down and other vessels should keep well clear at slow speed. In North America it is conventionally red with a white stripe from the upper left corner to the lower right corner.

Purpose 
The purpose of the flags is to notify to any other boats to steer clear for the safety of the diver and to avert the possibility of a collision with the dive boat which may be unable to maneuver out of the way.

Signal flag Alpha 

As a code signal the International maritime signal flag Alpha (or "Alfa", signifying the letter "A") has the meaning of "I have a diver down; keep well clear at slow speed", used to indicate the presence of a diver in the water and is used in all countries other than the United States, Canada, sometimes Italy, and countries within the US's diving culture sphere of influence such as certain countries within the Caribbean.

A rigid replica of the 'Alpha' flag is required to be displayed by any vessel engaged in diving operations when restricted in her ability to maneuver, if the size of the vessel makes it impractical to display the shapes and lights required by the International Regulations for Preventing Collisions at Sea (IRPCS) Rule 27.

The red and white flag

The use of the red and white flag, which was created in the early 1950s by Navy veteran Denzel James "Doc" Dockery of Michigan, and popularized by Ted Nixon of US Divers, is required by law or regulation in many US states, Canada, and some other countries (e.g. Italy). Usually the regulations require divers to display the flag while diving and to stay within a specified area when they are near the surface. There may also be a larger zone around the flag where no boats are allowed to pass. Some states also prohibit the display of this flag when there is no diver in water. It can be placed on a boat or on a surface marker buoy.

Other uses 
Today the red and white flag is so strictly associated with scuba diving in North America that it is also used to indicate a place where there are services for divers, for example stores selling or renting diving equipment or scuba service stations. It may be seen on the windows or bumpers of cars belonging to divers.

Code flag alfa/alpha also represents the letter 'A' in signalling.

Rock band Van Halen used the red and white flag as the cover art of their 1982 album Diver Down.

References

External links 

 
 
 
  Collection of US regulations for each state.

Flags introduced in 1956
Signal flags
Underwater diving safety equipment